Drosera browniana is a perennial tuberous species in the genus Drosera that is endemic to Western Australia. It grows in a rosette about 3 to 4 cm in diameter. It is a common species in an area from Mount Holland to Hatters Hill along the greenstone belt northwest of Esperance. It grows in loam soils in wet zones near granite outcrops. It flowers from August to September. It is considered to be related to D. bulbosa. It was first formally described by Allen Lowrie and N. G. Marchant in 1992 and named in honour of Andrew Brown, who discovered this species' first population.

See also 
List of Drosera species

References

External links 

Carnivorous plants of Australia
Caryophyllales of Australia
browniana
Eudicots of Western Australia
Plants described in 1992